Luis Gómez-Montejano (24 August 1922 – 5 February 2017) was a Spanish football administrator who was the Acting President of Real Madrid from 26 April 2006 until 2 July 2006.

Born in Madrid, Gómez-Montejano assumed the presidency of Real Madrid on 26 April 2006, after the resignation of Fernando Martín Álvarez, and left his post on 3 July 2006, when Ramón Calderón was elected.

References

  

 

1922 births
2017 deaths
People from Madrid
Spanish sports executives and administrators
Real Madrid CF presidents